You Gotta Move is a live DVD by the American hard rock band Aerosmith. It was released on November 23, 2004. It was filmed live at the Office Depot Center in Sunrise, FL on April 3, 2004 (except for "Back in the Saddle" and "Rats In The Cellar" which was recorded in Orlando, FL on April 5, 2004.) on the Honkin' on Bobo Tour.

The DVD features concert footage, band interviews, behind the scenes footage and a photo gallery. It also comes with a bonus audio CD featuring 6 tracks from the concert.

You Gotta Move quickly became the band's bestselling video release and one of the highest-selling music videos for the year 2005. That year, it went 4× Platinum in the United States.

Track listing
 "Toys in the Attic"
 "Love in an Elevator"
 "Road Runner"
 "Baby, Please Don't Go"
 "Cryin'"
 "The Other Side"
 "Back in the Saddle"
 "Draw The Line"
 "Dream On"
 "Stop Messin' Around"
 "Jaded"
 "I Don't Want to Miss a Thing"
 "Sweet Emotion"
 "Never Loved a Girl"
 "Walk This Way"
 "Train Kept A-Rollin'"

Bonus Tracks
 "Fever"
 "Rats in the Cellar"
 "Livin' on the Edge"
 "Last Child"
 "Same Old Song and Dance"

Bonus Audio CD
 "Toys in the Attic"
 "Love in an Elevator"
 "Rats in the Cellar"
 "Road Runner"
 "The Other Side"
"Back in the Saddle"
 "You Gotta Move - "Umixit" Track"

Certifications

References

Aerosmith video albums
2004 video albums
Live video albums
2004 live albums
Aerosmith live albums
Columbia Records video albums